Kheyrabad-e Sofla (also Romanized as Kheyrābād-e Soflá; also known as Kalāteh-ye Hāshemābād) is a village in Dibaj Rural District, Lotfabad District, Dargaz County, Razavi Khorasan Province, Iran. At the 2006 census, its population was 101, in 29 families.

References 

Populated places in Dargaz County